John A. Logan College is a public community college in Carterville, Illinois. It is part of the Illinois Community College System. As of 2016, it had a total enrollment of 4,424 students: 1,990 full- and 2,434 part-time.

History
John A. Logan College was established in 1967 under the Illinois Junior College Act of 1965, enrolled its first students in the fall of 1968, and acquired its permanent campus in 1969. The college is named for John A. Logan, a Civil War general who also, before and after the war, represented Illinois in the United States Congress as a member of both the House before the war, and Senate, after the war.

Academics
The college offers career preparation programs and two-year college transfer curriculum. Logan's transfer curriculum is articulated with Illinois' four-year universities. Online offerings include noncredit courses on topics not normally found in the higher education curriculum.

The college has been accredited since 1972 by the Higher Learning Commission of the North Central Association of Colleges and Schools. In 2008, the Higher Learning Commission approved it to offer an online Associate of Arts degree.

Under its open admissions policy, the college admits students who have graduated from an accredited high school, completed the GED, or are at least 18 years old. Applicants who have not graduated from high school must submit evidence of their ability to do college-level work.

Athletics
Intercollegiate team sports offerings include baseball (men's), basketball (men's and women's), golf (men's and women's), softball (women's), and volleyball (women's). College teams compete in the Great Rivers Athletic Conference and Region 24 of the National Junior College Athletic Association. The college mascot is the "Volunteers."

John A. Logan College Museum
The John A. Logan College Museum on the college campus provides exhibits and educational programs focused on southern Illinois, including its visual arts, cultural heritage, and natural history. A special feature of the museum is the Purdy School, a one-room schoolhouse from southern Perry County, Illinois, that served as a public school from around 1860 until 1951 and was moved to the campus in 1983. The museum also displays works by regional artists and crafts persons, ethnic textiles, and prints by Salvador Dalí.

Notable alumni
Stan Gouard, college basketball player and coach (Southern Indiana)
Rick McCarty, college basketball coach (Abilene Christian)
Jay Scrubb, basketball player

References

External links
 Official website

Art museums and galleries in Illinois
Buildings and structures in Williamson County, Illinois
Community colleges in Illinois
Education in Williamson County, Illinois
Educational institutions established in 1967
History museums in Illinois
Museums in Williamson County, Illinois
NJCAA athletics
1967 establishments in Illinois